Miao Siwen is a Chinese football player who plays for Shanghai Shengli. She studied at the East China University of Political Science and Law.

References

1995 births
Living people
Chinese women's footballers
China women's international footballers
Footballers at the 2020 Summer Olympics
Footballers from Shanghai
Olympic footballers of China
Women's association footballers not categorized by position